Darren Lapthorne (born 4 March 1983) is an Australian former professional racing cyclist.

Career 
Born in Melbourne, Lapthorne began his career in 2006 with the Australian Professional Team . In his first year, he won the road race of the Teams Road Championships. He also finished third in one stage of the Herald Sun Tour. In January 2007 he achieved his greatest success by winning the Australian National Road Race Championships. He rode for the German Team Sparkasse in 2008 and for British team  in 2009.

He retired from professional racing in 2016.

Personal life 
In December 2008, Lapthorne returned to competition after 2 months out following the much-publicised 18 September 2008 disappearance and death of his younger sister, Britt (born 1987), while she was backpacking in Dubrovnik, Croatia. During this time, Lapthorne was heavily involved in the early informal efforts to identify her whereabouts, and for helping to expose the lack of attention given to the case by local police. In late 2008, he assisted in the repatriation of her remains to Australia and also attended the subsequent state coroner's hearing in 2015.

Major results

2005
 1st Stage 9 Tour of the Murray River
2006
 1st Stage 7 Tour de Korea
 1st Stage 4 Tour of Gippsland
2007
 1st  Road race, National Road Championships
 1st Overall De Bortoli Tour
1st Stages 1a & 2
 1st Melle
 1st Stage 1b Tour of the Southern Grampians
 1st Stage 1 Mersey Valley Tour
 2nd Overall Tour de Hokkaido
1st Stage 5
2008
 1st Stage 5 Geelong Bay Classic Series, Geelong
2009
 1st Stage 2 Tour de Beauce
2010
 2nd Ryedale Grand Prix
2013
 8th Overall Tour of Japan
 10th Overall Tour of Hainan
2014
 3rd Overall Tour d'Azerbaïdjan

References

External links

1983 births
Living people
Australian male cyclists
Cyclists from Melbourne